This is a list of airlines currently operating in Japan.

Scheduled airlines

Domestic and international

Domestic

Charter

Cargo

See also
 List of defunct airlines of Japan
 List of airports in Japan
 List of airlines

References

Japan
Airlines
Airlines
Japan